The Hunter Medical Research Institute or HMRI is a medical research institute located in , New South Wales, Australia.

Established in 1998, the research institute is a partnership between the University of Newcastle, Australia,  Hunter New England Local Health District and the community. It aims to improve health and wellbeing of its communities.

References

External links

University of Newcastle (Australia)
Medical research institutes in New South Wales